The Biak naked-backed fruit bat (Dobsonia emersa) is a species of megabat in the family Pteropodidae. It is endemic to Indonesia.

Taxonomy and etymology
The Biak naked-backed fruit bat was first described as a species in 1985. Its species name "emersa" is from Latin "emergere," meaning "to emerge." Bergmans and Sarbini selected this name because zoologists such as Fredericus Anna Jentink had written about Dobsonia species from this area long ago, but had overlooked this taxon.

Description
It has a curved snout and relatively large eyes. Its teeth are small and narrow.

Range and status
It is endemic to Indonesia. It occupies both primary and secondary forests.

As of 2020, it is evaluated as a vulnerable species by the IUCN. It is susceptible to population decline via overhunting and disturbance of its roost sites.

References

Dobsonia
Bats of Indonesia
Bat, Biak naked-backed fruit
Biak
Vulnerable fauna of Asia
Mammals described in 1985
Taxonomy articles created by Polbot